Lists of Greek ships include:

 List of Greece-flagged cargo ships
 List of active Hellenic Navy ships
 List of current Greek frigates
 List of decommissioned ships of the Hellenic Navy

See also
 Greek shipping
 Hellenistic-era warships
 
 

Lists of transport lists
Lists of ships by country
Ships of Greece